Simone Terenzani (born 1978) is an Italian motorcycle speedway rider who rode in 2005 Speedway Grand Prix.

Career details

World Championships 
 Individual World Championship and Speedway Grand Prix
 2005 - 32nd place (0 pts in one event)
 2006 - did not start as track reserve
 Team World Championship (Speedway World Team Cup and Speedway World Cup)
 1998 - 5th place in Group B
 1999 - 2nd place in Quarter-Final A
 2003 - 12th place
 2004 - 7th place

European Championships 
 European Pairs Championship
 2004 - 6th place in Semi-Final 1
 2005 -  Gdańsk - 6th place (1 pt)
 2006 - 6th place in Semi-Final 2
1999 Under-21 Italian champion

See also 
 Italy national speedway team
 List of Speedway Grand Prix riders

References 

1978 births
Italian speedway riders
Living people